Phyo Ngwe Soe (born 28 April 1983 ) is a Burmese actor .

Phyo is considered one of the most successful actor in Burmese cinema. Throughout his career, he has acted in over 176 films.

Filmography

Film (Cinema)

Ko Tint Toh Super Yat Kwat (2014)
Mhaw Kyauk Sar (2018)
Tin String (2019)
Guest (2019)
Ananda: Rise of Notra (2019)

Television series
Charm (2016)

Acting career

In 2019, he played in the Burmese big screen film Tin String movie directed by Arkar and alongside Eaindra Kyaw Zin, Shwe Eain Si, Ye Naung and Yell Htwe Aung.  The same year, he took in the film "Guest (2019 film) " alongside Shwe Htoo, Shwe Hmone Yati, Nay Chi Oo.

Reference

1983 births
Living people
Burmese male film actors
Burmese male models
21st-century Burmese actresses